The Ever Popular Tortured Artist Effect is Todd Rundgren's tenth studio album, released in 1982. The album is a return to the pop sound for which Rundgren is generally most lauded by critics. Considering it a contractual obligation, he spent little time working on Tortured Artist (hence the title). However, the album was generally well-received, and Rundgren scored a hit with the novelty song "Bang the Drum All Day".

The album was also his last official release on Bearsville Records.

Track listing
All songs by Todd Rundgren; except when noted.

Side one
"Hideaway" – 4:58
"Influenza" – 4:29
"Don't Hurt Yourself" – 3:41
"There Goes Your Baybay" – 3:53

Side two
"Tin Soldier" (Ronnie Lane, Steve Marriott) – 3:10
"Emperor of the Highway" – 1:39
"Bang the Drum All Day" – 3:32
"Drive" – 5:26
"Chant" – 4:20

Personnel
Todd Rundgren - all vocals and instruments, art direction, engineer, producer
Technical
Bean - additional engineering

Charts
Album

Single

References

External links
 

Todd Rundgren albums
1982 albums
Albums produced by Todd Rundgren
Bearsville Records albums
Rhino Records albums